Wazoo is a live album by Frank Zappa, posthumously released in October 2007 as a 2-CD set consisting of the complete concert given by "The Mothers of Invention/Hot Rats/Grand Wazoo" 20-piece big band on September 24, 1972 at the Music Hall, Boston, Massachusetts, United States. It is the third installment on the Vaulternative Records label that is dedicated to the posthumous release of complete Zappa concerts, following the releases of FZ:OZ (2002) and Buffalo (2007).

Overview
It is the last concert of a brief series of shows that marked Zappa's return to the stage after his forced temporary retirement from the touring scene due to the injuries he suffered from an assault during a concert at the Rainbow Theatre in London on December 10, 1971.

The material showcases Zappa's endeavors in jazz-based music, and many of the compositions were featured on the 1972 studio albums The Grand Wazoo and  Waka/Jawaka and on the 1978 studio album Studio Tan. Rehearsals leading to these albums and concerts are documented on Joe's Domage (2004), while Imaginary Diseases (2006) presents live recordings with a stripped-down version of the big band named 'Petit Wazoo'.

Production

Sleeve design 

The album cover is a visual parody of Slave Market with the Disappearing Bust of Voltaire, by Salvador Dalí. Frank Zappa's face replaces that of Voltaire's in the original, among other changes.

Track listing 

All tracks written, composed and arranged by Frank Zappa. At the concert, "Big Swifty" was played between "The Adventures of Greggery Peccary" and "Penis Dimension".

Musicians 

The Mothers of Invention / Hot Rats / Grand Wazoo:

 Frank Zappa – guitar and white stick with cork handle
 Tony Duran – slide guitar
 Ian Underwood – electric piano and synthesizer
 Jerry Kessler – electric cello
 Dave Parlato – bass
 Tom Raney – vibes and electric percussion
 Ruth Underwood – marimba and electric percussion
 Jim Gordon – acoustic & electric drums
 Mike Altshul – piccolo flute, bass clarinet and other winds
 Jay Migliori – flute, tenor sax and other winds
 Earl Dumler – oboe, contrabass sarrusophone and other winds
 Ray Reed – clarinet, tenor sax and other winds
 Charles Owens – soprano sax, alto sax and other winds
 Joann McNab – bassoon
 Malcolm McNab – trumpet in D
 Sal Marquez – trumpet in Bb
 Tom Malone – trumpet in Bb, also tuba
 Bruce Fowler – trombone of the upper atmosphere
 Glenn Ferris – trombone and euphonium
 Kenny Shroyer – trombone and baritone horn

Notes

External links 

 The Official Frank Zappa Site
 Progarchives listing for Zappa Wazoo
 Wazoo album at Discogs.com

Live albums published posthumously
Frank Zappa live albums
2007 live albums